Dubbo is a city in the Orana Region of New South Wales, Australia. It is the largest population centre in the Orana region, with a population of 43,516 at June 2021.

The city is located at the intersection of the Newell, Mitchell, and Golden highways. It is linked by national highways north to Brisbane, south to Melbourne, east to Sydney and Newcastle, and west to Broken Hill and Adelaide.

Dubbo is included in the rainfall and weather forecast region for the Central West Slopes and in the Central West Slopes and Plains division of the Bureau of Meteorology forecasts.

History 

Evidence of habitation by Wiradjuri Nation, Indigenous Australians dates back over 40,000 years.

Explorer and surveyor John Oxley was the first European to report on the area, now known as Dubbo, in 1818. The first permanent British colonists in the area were English-born Robert Dulhunty and his brother Lawrence Dulhunty.

Dulhunty occupied a property, known as Dubbo Station (established in 1828), from the early 1830s on a squatting basis. With the passing of the Squatting Act in 1836, he took out a licence on the property.

Dulhunty showed an affinity with Indigenous Australians, his party included some 40 Aboriginals and he favoured using Aboriginal names for properties, including Dubbo. Dubbo is now thought to be a mispronunciation of the local Wiradjuri word thubbo, but because of a lack of precise records from Dulhunty at the time and an incomplete knowledge of the Wiradjuri language today, some conjecture remains over the word's meaning. Some references indicate that Dubbo was the name of an old Wiradjuri man who resided at the site when Dulhunty took the land. Dubbo's name apparently meant "red soil", consistent with the local landscape. Thubbo or tubbo possibly is Wiradjuri for "head covering".

Dundullimal Homestead is a farmhouse from that period, built around 1840 by John Maugham on his  sheep station. The building is one of the oldest homesteads still standing in western NSW and today is open to visitors.

In 1846, due to the number of settlers in the area, the government decided to establish a courthouse, police station, and lock-up in the Dubbo area. A constable's residence was completed in 1847 and a wooden slab-construction courthouse and lock-up was completed in early 1848. By this time, the settlement had only four buildings - the constable's residence, courthouse and lock-up, a store, and an inn.

Due to the lack of title for the land, in 1848, storekeeper Jean Emile Serisier organised a petition asking for a land sale of town allotments. The plan was presented to the colony's surveyor general in May 1849 by surveyor G. Boyle White. The settlement was gazetted as a village in November 1849 with the first land sales taking place in 1850. Population growth was slow until the Victorian gold rush of the 1860s brought an increase in north–south trade. The first bank was opened in 1867. Steady population growth caused the town to be proclaimed a municipality in 1872, when its population was 850. The railway extension of the main western railway from Wellington to Dubbo was formally opened on 1 February 1881. By 1897, Dubbo had a general store, Carrier Arms, a slab courthouse, a gaol, and a police hut. The final section of the Molong to Dubbo railway opened in late May 1925.
Dubbo was officially proclaimed a city in 1966.

Heritage listings

Dubbo has a number of heritage-listed sites, including:
 Cobra Street: Dubbo RAAF Stores Depot
 Macquarie Street: Talbragar Shire Council Chambers
 110-114 Macquarie Street: National Australia Bank building, Dubbo
 118 Macquarie Street: Colonial Mutual Life building, Dubbo
 195-197 Macquarie Street: Milestone Hotel
 215 Macquarie Street: Old Dubbo Gaol
 Main Western railway: Dubbo railway station
 Main Western railway 462.762 km: Macquarie River railway bridge, Dubbo
 Obley Road: Dundullimal Homestead

Geography 

The Macquarie River runs through Dubbo, as does Troy Creek. The City of Dubbo lies within a transition zone between the ranges and tablelands of the Great Dividing Range to the east and the Darling Basin plains to the west.

Climate 
Dubbo falls in the warm temperate climate zone. Under Köppen climate classification, Dubbo has a humid subtropical climate (Cfa) that borders the semi-arid climate (BSk). Summers are warm to hot, and winters cool to cold, bringing some occurrences of early morning frost but generally no snowfall – unlike the nearby city of Orange. The last occurrence of snow was recorded by The Dubbo Liberal and Macquarie Advocate in July 1951 and 1920. The town's location in this transition area allows a large temperature variation during the year, with high summer temperatures, sometimes peaking above  typical of the Western Plains of New South Wales and colder subzero temperatures typical of the Central Tablelands in winter.

Dubbo's location in the transition area between the Central Tablelands and the Central Western Plains has provided a mild distribution of rainfall throughout the year. Dubbo's wettest month is January with an average rainfall of  occurring on average over five days. Dubbo is considerably sunny, receiving 148.6 days of clear skies annually, in contrast to Sydney's 104 days.

Wind patterns vary over the whole year. The prevailing winds at Dubbo are from the southeast, south, southwest and west, which account for a combined 64.4% of the wind direction over the whole year.

Demographics 

In August 2021, the population of Dubbo was 43,516; 51.6% of residents were female and 48.4% were male. The median age is 35, slightly younger than the national average of 38. People aged 0–14 constitute 21.5% of the population compared to 18.2% nationally, and 15.6% of residents are Aboriginal or Torres Strait Islander; the median age in this group is 22.

About 81.2% of residents report being born in Australia, notably higher than the national average of 66.9%. Other than Australia, the most common countries of birth are India (1.7%), Nepal (1.6%), England (1.0%), the Philippines (0.8%), and New Zealand (0.7%). The most common reported ancestries in Dubbo are Australian, English, Australian Aboriginal, Irish, and Scottish.

Around 72.3% of residents report both parents having been born in Australia, significantly higher than the national average of 45.9%. About 82.7% of people only spoke English at home. Other languages spoken at home included Nepali (1.7%), Punjabi (0.8%), Malayalam (0.5%), Urdu (0.5%), and Mandarin (0.4%).

The top religious groups in Dubbo are Catholic (26.4%), Anglican (17.7%), and Uniting Church (3.7%); 27.2% reported no religion (lower than the 38.4% nationally) and 9.2% did not answer the question.

Economy 

The city's largest private employer is Fletcher International Exports, which exports lamb and mutton globally. Other local industries reflect the city's status as a regional base for surrounding agricultural regions.

A large employer is the Dubbo Base Hospital, with hospitals (excluding psychiatric hospitals) being the area's single largest employer.

Retail 

Dubbo is also considered a major shopping centre for the surrounding regional areas in the Central and Far Western districts of New South Wales. Dubbo has many shopping districts, including the large and very recently renewed Orana Mall (East Dubbo), Macquarie and Talbragar Streets (City Centre), Centro Dubbo, Riverdale, and Tamworth Street local stores (South Dubbo). Dubbo features many boutiques and unique stores, as well as major national stores including Myer, Big W, Kmart (replaced Target in October 2020), Officeworks, Coles, Woolworths, Mitre 10, Bunnings Warehouse, The Good Guys, Harvey Norman, JB Hi-Fi, Sportsmans Warehouse and The Coffee Club.

A new suburban shopping centre in West Dubbo contains a Woolworths supermarket (Dubbo's third) and 15 smaller retail shops.

Tourism 

Tourism is also a significant local industry. Dubbo features the open-range Taronga Western Plains Zoo, which is home to various species of endangered animals, including the white, black, and Indian rhinoceroses, and runs a successful breeding program for a number of endangered species. The zoo is home to numerous specimens from around the world in spacious open-range moat enclosures, grouped according to their continent of origin. Other town attractions include the historic Dundullimal Homestead and the historic Old Dubbo Gaol in the middle of the commercial centre of Macquarie Street. The Western Plains Cultural Centre includes four gallery exhibition spaces, two museum exhibition spaces, and a community arts centre.
The Royal Flying Doctor Service base at Dubbo airport has a large visitor information centre, staffed by volunteers, which features a King Air 200 turboprop aircraft and a variety of touch-screen interactive displays illustrating aspects of RFDS operations.

Education 
The 20 schools and secondary colleges include the Dubbo School of Distance Education. It is home to one of the four main campuses of Charles Sturt University, which is located next to the Senior Campus of Dubbo College (successor to Dubbo High School, founded in 1917). There are three private K-12 schools located in Dubbo which are Macquarie Anglican Grammar School, Dubbo Christian School and St Johns College.

Architecture 
Dubbo has several fine examples of Victorian civic architecture, including the (third) Courthouse (1887), the Lands Office with its use of timber and corrugated iron cladding, and the railway station (1881). Towards the centre of the city, the older residential areas contain numerous examples of red brick houses built in the "California Bungalow" style architecture of the early 20th century, together with Victorian terraced houses (mostly in the Darling Street area) and a few Edwardian semidetached homes.

Transport 

Dubbo railway station lies on the Main Western railway line between Sydney and Bourke and opened in 1881. The station is the terminus for the daily NSW TrainLink Central West XPT service from Sydney with connecting road coach services to Broken Hill, Bourke, Cootamundra, Lightning Ridge and Nyngan. The Mindyarra Maintenance Centre is scheduled to open 700 metres to the east of the station in the early 2020s, as the home depot for the NSW TrainLink Regional Train fleet.

Dubbo Buslines operate services within the city. BusBiz operate coach services under contract to NSW TrainLink and maintain a depot in the city.

Dubbo City Regional Airport has flights to Sydney (QantasLink, Regional Express), Newcastle (FlyPelican), Canberra (FlyPelican) and other small outback New South Wales towns (Airlink).

Media 

Local print media include:
The Daily Liberal
The Weekly Dubbo Photo News
The Weekly Mailbox Shopper

Three commercially licensed radio stations broadcast in the city:
 Triple M broadcasts on FM 93.5, playing rock music.
 2DU – a local heritage station, it broadcasts on AM 1251.
 Zoo FM – a rock music station, it broadcasts on FM 92.7.

ABC Radio also has a studio in the city: ABC Western Plains, local news and talk on 95.9FM.

ABC Radio broadcasts five services to the Dubbo area: ABC Local, ABC Radio National, Triple J, ABC Classic FM, and ABC NewsRadio.

The city also has narrowcast stations on 90.3 FM Racing Radio, a tourist radio station and a country music station. The city has two community stations: DCFM 88.9 Dubbo Community radio, and Rhema FM, which broadcasts Christian music.

The Dubbo area is served by five television stations. In common with all Australian TV stations, they now broadcast digital transmissions only, with the primary program in each case being designated as:
 Seven (formerly Prime7), 7two, 7mate, 7Bravo, 7flix – owned an operated by the Seven Network.
 10 Regional, 10 Bold, 10 Peach, 10 Shake – an affiliate of Network 10
 WIN Television, 9Go!, 9Gem, 9Life – an affiliate of the Nine Network
 ABC TV – ABC, ABC TV Plus, ABC Me, ABC News
 SBS Television – SBS, SBS Viceland, SBS Food, NITV

Prime7 and WIN Television both produce half-hour-long local news bulletins. Prime7 News screens at 6 pm, while WIN News screens at 7 pm from Monday to Friday.  Nine News Central West is an hour-long bulletin that mixes local and national news.

Subscription Television services are provided by Foxtel.

Sport and recreation 

Sports play a big role in Dubbo's community life. Rugby league is popular in Dubbo. Two teams compete in the Group 11 Rugby League – the Dubbo CYMS and Dubbo Macquarie Raiders. The city also has an Australian rules football team, the Dubbo Demons, who were premiers in the Central West Australian Football League in 2007. Two rugby union teams are active, the Dubbo Kangaroos (Roos) and the Dubbo Rhinos, which compete in the Central West Rugby competition, the Blowes Clothing Cup. Dubbo Junior Cricket Association conducts cricket for over 500 children aged between 5 and 16 during October to March and also conducts first-, second-, and third-grade competitions during this time.

Dubbo has a turf club, which incorporates a pony club and horse racing, and organises shows and gymkhana. Ultimate Frisbee is a new sport to the town and is rapidly growing in popularity. 

The Dubbo Ultimate Frisbee Federation (DUFF) is the local Ultimate club and organises a local league and the Dubbo Meerkats Mixed rep side.
The Dubbo Rams compete in the men's and women's NSW State Basketball Leagues. Netball is also popular in Dubbo with competitions every weekend for all age groups during netball season at the Nita McGrath netball courts near the Macquarie River in Central Dubbo. Dubbo has a large Junior and Senior Hockey Association with representative teams for all ages, while also participating in the Premier League Hockey Competition in both the Men's (Dubbo Lions) and Women's (Dubbo Blue Jays). Soccer is very popular, particularly among children. Dubbo has its own all-age men's and women's competition and has three teams – Dubbo FC Bulls, Westside Panthers, and Orana Spurs, who compete in the Western Premier League. Dubbo also has one of the only 10 lane pools outside of Sydney in NSW, the Dubbo Aquatic and Leisure Centre. The centre hosts meets through the Western Swimming Association (and affiliated clubs Dubbo City Swimtech and Orana Aquatic) and school carnivals.

Dubbo's Caltex Park hosted the annual City vs Country Origin match in 2006, with an attendance of 11,423, and in 2014, with an attendance of more than 9,600 in rainy conditions.

In 2007, Dubbo hosted the Junior World Orienteering Championships with most of the events held in the granite outcrops of the nearby Sappa Bulga Range. From this event, the orienteering club Western Plains Orienteers was born. Other sports popular in Dubbo include lawn bowls, via the huge variety of bowling clubs, and golf (on Dubbo's 27-hole golf course).

In 2022, Dubbo hosted the NSWPSSA Boys Cricket State Championships. The competition took place in Victoria Park, and Lady Cuttler Fields 1-5.

Notable people 
Kirsty Lee Allan – actress in Australian drama series Sea Patrol
 Frederick William Bamford (1849–1934) – politician
 Braidon Burns, rugby league player for the Canterbury Bulldogs
 Matt Burton, rugby league player for the Canterbury Bulldogs
 Brandon Costin – former NRL player
 Les Davidson – former NRL international
 Megan Dunn – cyclist winning two gold in the 2010 Delhi Commonwealth Games.
 Kaide Ellis, rugby league player for the St. George Illawarra Dragons
 Lizzy Gardiner – costume designer
 Luke Garner – second row for NRL Club West Tigers
 Pearl Gibbs (1901–1983) - Aboriginal leader, lived and died in Dubbo
 Margaret Packham Hargrave – writer, poet, local poultry farmer, wrote for Daily Liberal
 Ella Havelka (born 1989), first Indigenous person to join The Australian Ballet
 Bob Hewitt (born 1940) – tennis player and convicted rapist
 Geoffrey Lancaster – international concert pianist
 Jean Lee – the last woman officially executed in Australia, in 1951
 Kate Leigh – Sydney sly grog bar operator
 Adrian Leijer – Australian international soccer player
 Ben McCalman - Australian rugby union player (Western Force, Wallabies)
 Glenn McGrath – Australian international cricketer, born in Dubbo and raised in Narromine
 Amy Mills (1986–) – Australian Deaflympic gold medallist
 Kyle Noke – international MMA fighter, UFC fighter (Ultimate Fighting Championship)
 Dean Pay – former NRL international and coach, grew up and retired in Dubbo
 David Peachey – former NRL player
 Steve Peacocke – actor, known for his role in soap opera Home and Away
 Luke Priddis – former NRL player
 The Reels – 1980s pop band, founders: John Bliss, Craig Hooper, Dave Mason
 Andrew Ryan – former NRL player and current ABC Radio Grandstand Rugby League sideline expert
 Jean Emile Serisier was Dubbo's first businessman.
 Robert Adam Spears (1893–1950) – professional cyclist
 Nicole Sykes – Australian International soccer player, and captain for Canberra United
 Ashleigh Sykes – Australian International soccer player
 Thirsty Merc – Australian rock band
 Barrie Unsworth – 36th Premier of New South Wales
 Isaah Yeo – rugby league player and co-captain for the Penrith Panthers
 Justin Yeo – former NRL player

See also 

 City of Dubbo
 Electoral district of Dubbo
 Orana (New South Wales)

References

External links 

Dubbo Tourism (official website)
Dubbo City Council
Dubbo – Visit NSW

 

 
Towns in the Central West (New South Wales)
Newell Highway
Dubbo Regional Council